Alexander Dawson Henderson Jr. (February 16, 1895 – July 8, 1964), was a business leader, financier and philanthropist, and long-time mayor of Hillsboro Beach, Florida. He was Vice President and Director of the California Perfume Company (CPC), which later became Avon Products. Henderson is also known for his philanthropy; he created the Hillsboro Country Day School, and is known for being the namesake of the Alexander D. Henderson University School at Florida Atlantic University.

Early life

Alexander D. Henderson was born on February 16, 1895, in Brooklyn, New York, the son of Alexander. D. Henderson Sr. and Ella Margaret Brown. He was the grandson of Joseph Henderson (pilot) and brother to Girard B. Henderson. In 1909, the Henderson family moved to Suffern, New York. Henderson spent most of his early life in Suffern.

In June 1914, when Henderson was 19, his father took the family on a two-month vacation-business trip to Europe. They saw fields of flowers and bought necessary oils from the French. The family also visited the oil factories that made the perfume for the California Perfume Company.

Marriage and children

On February 14, 1920, Henderson married Mary Barnes Billings Anthony in Ridgewood, New Jersey, daughter of Walter Dayton Anthony. They had two children, Mary and Alexander. In September 1935, they got divorced in Reno, Las Vegas.  On March 28, 1936, Henderson married Lucia Maria Ernst in New York City. They had a son named A. Douglas who was born in New York City.

Military
From 1912 to 1915, Henderson attended the New York Military Academy, a boarding school at Cornwall-on-Hudson, New York, south of Newburgh. At the New York Military Academy, Henderson was listed as Lieutenant of Company B.

In 1916, Henderson attended Dartmouth College in Hanover, New Hampshire, and belonged to the ZETA Chapter of the PSI Upsilon Fraternity. By midyear, he decided to leave Dartmouth and volunteer for the U. S. Army during World War I. On August 15, 1917, he was called into active service at the Student Officer Training Camp in the Ramapo, New York precinct. Because of his military experience while at the New York Military Academy, he became a 2nd Lieutenant in the Cavalry, stationed at Fort Dix, New Jersey. He was also stationed at Company D, Hughes High School in Cincinnati, Ohio. He was promoted 1st Lieutenant on April 8, 1918.

Professional life

California Perfume Company

Henderson started working for the California Perfume Company (CPC) in 1919 in the shipping department. By 1925, Henderson had become vice president and a Director of CPC in charge of purchases.
 
On October 6, 1939, The California Perfume Company changed its name to Allied Products and then, in 1939, to Avon Products Inc.

On April 12, 1940, it was reported that Henderson had resigned as vice-president of the Allied Products Company of Suffern, after 23 years of service. He would remain a director of the company. He was going to work with a boyhood friend, Sanford M. Treat

Retirement
In 1946, Henderson and his family moved to Hillsboro Beach, Broward County, Florida. Henderson and his brother continued to serve on Avon's Board of Directors. From 1945 to 1960, A. D. Henderson was listed as Director in the company's Annual Reports.

Politics
Henderson became vice mayor of Hillsboro Beach, Florida in 1955. He became the Mayor of Hillsboro Beach in 1958 and held this position for six consecutive years (1958–1964).

On June 1, 1965, after the death of Henderson, Police Chief Raymond McMullin presented a memorial to the former mayor's window, Lucy Henderson. She turned the plaque over to the town's present mayor. The memorial will be displayed in the Town Council Room.

Philanthropy
In 1953, Henderson created the Hillsboro Country Day School in Pompano Beach, Florida.

The A. D. Henderson Foundation was founded in 1959 by Henderson and his wife, Lucy E. Henderson with the vision to improving the lives of children in Broward County, Florida and the State of Vermont through early learning.

Henderson was named building committee chairman and the founding donor of Saint Andrew's School, a private episcopal school in Boca Raton. 

In 1960, a donation from Henderson and his wife Lucy contributed to the construction of the Henderson Behavioral Health facility in Fort Lauderdale, Florida. The clinic was renamed Henderson Clinic of Broward County in 1961.

Death
Henderson died on July 8, 1964, at the New England Deaconess Hospital in Boston, Massachusetts. He was 69 years old. He was interred at the Forest Lawn Memorial Gardens Central in Fort Lauderdale. His wife, Lucia Ernst Henderson is buried in the same crypt.

Legacy

On December 1, 1968, the A.D. Henderson University School at the Florida Atlantic University College of Education was dedicated in his honor. The Alexander D. Henderson University School is a public elementary and middle school (K-8) and legislated school district operating as an educational laboratory on the FAU's Boca Raton campus. The Chapel of Saint Andrew, located on the campus of Saint Andrew's School in Boca Raton, Florida, was dedicated in memory of Alexander D. Henderson.

References

External links
  

1895 births
1964 deaths
Philanthropists from New York (state)
American manufacturing businesspeople
People from Brooklyn
People from Suffern, New York
Military personnel from New York City
People from Hillsboro Beach, Florida
20th-century American philanthropists
20th-century American businesspeople
People associated with direct selling